Geisecke is a city district of the city Schwerte in North Rhine-Westphalia, Germany. On 31 December 2012, it had a population of 3,009 inhabitants. Geisecke is located north of the Ruhr near the Sauerland. The city center of Schwerte is a few kilometers to the west.

References

External links 

 Geisecke on Schwerte.de

Unna (district)